The Fugal Dugout House is a historic house at what is now 630 North 400 East in Pleasant Grove, Utah, built in 1869.

Description and history 
It was used as the foundation for a stone house in 1882. It "is architecturally significant as the only known example in Utah of a dugout serving as the basis for a later house expansion." It was listed on the National Register of Historic Places in 1986.

See also
Fugal Blacksmith Shop

References

Dugouts
Houses completed in 1869
Houses on the National Register of Historic Places in Utah
Houses in Utah County, Utah
1869 establishments in Utah Territory
National Register of Historic Places in Utah County, Utah